Monique Willocq is a Belgian politician, member of the Centre démocrate humaniste.

Political career

Political posts held:

 Walloon MP and for the French Community since 3 July 2007
 Communal councillor of Tournai

External links
 Site of the Parliament of the Brussels Walloon Community

Year of birth missing (living people)
Living people
Centre démocrate humaniste politicians
Members of the Parliament of Wallonia
Members of the Parliament of the French Community
Walloon people
21st-century Belgian politicians
21st-century Belgian women politicians